Yuri Fedorovich Shabanov (11 November 1937 Khabarovsk – 30 March 2010, Moscow) was a Soviet and Russian chess Grandmaster (2003), arbiter of the republican category (1997).

Two-time world senior chess champion: Bad Zwischenahn (2003) and Halle (2004). Three-time European champion in the team of Russian seniors (2001, 2002 and 2006). Three-time Moscow senior chess champion (2005, 2006 and 2007). Russian senior chess champion (1999). Champion of the Far East (1961). Multiple champion of the Magadan - Far North region (1961-1980).

Biography 

Yuri Fedorovich Shabanov was born in the family of the editor-in-chief of a Far Eastern publishing house in 1937. He grew up practically without a father, since his father died during the World War II. His family moved from Khabarovsk after the end of the war. First, they moved to Nizhneudinsk, Irkutsk Region, later they moved to Lviv. Shabanov started to learn chess in 1951.

The young first-ranked player eventually played at the All-Union Youth Olympiad in Kiev as a part of the Ukrainian team in 1954. He scored 7 points out of 9 and took the second place in the semifinals. He scored 8.5 points out of 12 and took the third place in the final.

The All-Union Youth Championship took place in the city of Leningrad at the same year. Yuri played for the team of Ukraine on the third board. The team shared 4th and 5th place with the Leningrad team. Boris Spassky, Mikhail Tal, Edward Gufeld and others took part in this tournament, but Yuri Shabanov did not meet them.

Further, he became the winner of the regional chess championship in the city of Khabarovsk. The primacy of the children's park in chess was held in Khabarovsk in 1955: Yuri scored 9 points out of 10 and took the first place. A zonal competition of the leading chess players of the Khabarovsk and Primorye Territories, Amur, Sakhalin and other regions was held in the city of Blagoveshchensk in 1957. At this time, Yuri Shabanov was a student of the Magadan mining technical school and became a candidate for the USSR Master of Sports after he scored 12 points out of 17 and took the first place. Later he got the right to participate in the 17th championship of the RSFSR, which was held in the city of Chelyabinsk. Yuri scored 10.5 points out of 19 and took 6-9 place.

Shabanov repeatedly won the Far Eastern semi-finals of the RSFSR, and participated in Russian championships. He became a multiple champion of the Magadan Region since 1960. Yuri was awarded a diploma in geology and worked in his specialty, so he didn't have much time to play chess. Only after the 1964 Trud Championship, where Yuri took the first place and got the title of the USSR Master of Sports, chess come to the fore of his life.

The practical strength of Yuri Shabanov grew. He was one of the strongest chess masters in the 70s. He won the finals of the Trud Championship again in 1978. Yuri participated in the semifinals of the USSR regularly, but every time he lacks something for a decisive step. Only after moving to Yaroslavl, where Shabanov worked as an instructor at the Children's and Youth Sports School, Yuri Fedorovich fulfilled his dream and entered in the First League of the Soviet Championship, where he took the fifth place in the 80s.

Shabanov became an international master in the 90s. He joined the powerful Russian senior chess movement and lived in Moscow since 2000s. He took part in the team championships of Moscow 2004-2008. He participated in six European Championships as a part of Russian seniors team in 2001, 2002, 2004, 2006, 2007 and 2008. He participated in the championships of Russia among seniors in 1999-2007. He also took part in the Moscow Senior Chess Championship in 2003–2007. He participated in the traditional matches of the Moscow-St. Petersburg as part of the Moscow team in 2002 and 2005.

Shabanov was awarded the title of international grandmaster for the victory at the 13th World Senior Chess Championship in 2003. He repeated his success and became a two-time world senior chess champion at the 14th World Senior Chess Championship in 2004.

He stopped participating in major chess competitions due to a serious illness since 2008.

Close people and comrades of Yuri Fedorovich Shabanov characterized him as an exceptionally modest, conflict-free, erudite and principled person. He was a man in love with chess and dedicated about 60 years of his life to chess.Yuri Shabanov died on March 30, 2010.

Sports Achievements

References

External links

1937 births
2010 deaths
Chess grandmasters
Soviet chess players
Russian chess players
World Senior Chess Champions